Qaleh Askar (also Romanized as Qal‘eh ‘Askar and Qal‘eh-ye ‘Askar; also known as Qal‘eh ‘Asgar and Qal‘eh-i-Asghar) is a village in Qaleh Asgar Rural District, Lalehzar District, Bardsir County, Kerman Province, Iran. At the 2006 census, its population was 559, in 137 families.

References 

Populated places in Bardsir County